Casper Holstein (December 7, 1876 – April 5, 1944) was a prominent New York mobster involved in the Harlem "numbers rackets" during the Harlem Renaissance.

Early life
His birth name was Egbert Joseph, he changed his name in honor of his maternal grandfather Holstein. Born of mixed African and Danish descent in St. Croix, Danish West Indies, Casper Holstein moved to New York City with his mother in 1884. 
His father was a landed mulatto who owned a butcher shop and owner of a large farm. His mother was the daughter of an officer in the Danish Militia. Attending high school in Brooklyn, he enlisted in the United States Navy following his graduation. During World War I, he was able to revisit his birthplace while stationed in what had become the United States Virgin Islands. After the war, Holstein worked as janitor and doorman in Manhattan eventually becoming a messenger, and then head messenger, for a commodities brokerage on Wall Street.

Rebirth of the Harlem numbers racket
During this time, he began to become familiar with the stock market and began studying the system and numbers. He was eventually able to devise a lottery system based on those principles. Previously under and before Matthews the number was set by a system in which a set of digits 0 to 9 were drawn out at random and posted in a club house. This however allowed for the organizer to cut losses by fixing the outcome. It also created limitations on disseminating the winning number out to the gamblers. There were unrelated statistical numbers published by the newspapers which Holstein found could be used by an organizer instead. At various times the US Customs House receipts, New York Stock Exchange daily share volume and leading horse race parimutuel betting handle have all been used to set the daily number. This change permitted a larger number of gamblers to play the same game and with reduced fear of fixing. As the Prohibition began, Holstein's lottery system proved popular and soon Holstein became known as the "Bolita King", going on to earn an estimated $2 million from his lotteries.

In 1932 Dixie Davis, the court house attorney who provided service for the runners for many of the numbers operators, decided that he could make more money if he were to take over as central organizer. In order to enforce his seizure of power, he brought in Dutch Schultz, who could see that Prohibition which had proved lucrative for him was reaching its end. Rather than accept a back seat however, he decided he wanted the central role. One by one various numbers operators were picked up by Schultz and told they would have to deal with him. Most complied but he was resisted by Madame Stephanie St. Clair and Bumpy Johnson. Holstein saw himself as having a political mission which would be undermined by violence and dropped out of active or central involvement overseeing street collection. The numbers game then continued operating with mostly Black collectors and mid level management. This was under mostly White leadership and by St. Clair and Johnson. Holstein continued on the periphery as a wholesale lay off gambler for several years but was arrested and stopped in 1937.

Political activism
Holstein was a major donor towards charitable purposes such as building dormitories at black colleges, as well as financing many of the neighborhood's artists, writers, and poets during the Harlem Renaissance. He bought the mortgage on the New York hall of the Universal Negro Improvement Association and allowed it to continue to be used as a black function hall until the Marcus Garvey organization collapsed. The site was then developed by him as Holstein Court a residential building for Black business owners and professionals. He also helped establish a Baptist school in Liberia and established a hurricane relief fund for his native Virgin Islands. He was a regular contributor of articles to the NAACP newspaper Crisis.

Prohibition and later years
By the end of the 1920s, Holstein had become a dominant figure among Harlem's numerous policy operators. Although both he and rival Stephanie St. Clair claimed to have invented the way that "numbers games" chose the winning number, both claims have long been in dispute. He controlled a large scale numbers-running operation, as well as nightclubs and other legitimate business. His income may have been as high as $12,000 a day at its peak, and he was generous with his wealth. According to The New York Times, he was "Harlem's favorite hero", because of his wealth, his sporting proclivities and his philanthropies among his community.

Kidnapping
In 1928, he was kidnapped by five white men who demanded a ransom of $50,000. He was released three days later, insisting that no ransom was paid. The incident was never explained.

In popular culture
The character Valentin Narcisse, played by Jeffrey Wright, on season 4 and 5 of the HBO period crime-drama Boardwalk Empire was inspired by Holstein.

References

External links
  by Sara Smollett

1876 births
1944 deaths
African-American gangsters
American gangsters
American crime bosses
American people of Danish descent
American people of United States Virgin Islands descent
Criminals from Manhattan
Gangsters from New York City
People from Saint Croix, U.S. Virgin Islands
Prohibition-era gangsters
Numbers game
20th-century African-American people